Montefiore Hospital may refer to:

The Montefiore Hospital in Hove, United Kingdom
Montefiore Medical Center in The Bronx, New York City, United States
UPMC Montefiore in Pittsburgh, Pennsylvania, United States

See also 
 Montefiore